The Alfa Romeo 500 is a 3 tonne class truck, produced by Alfa Romeo from 1937 to 1945. The range included a diesel-powered (Deutz type F6M 313)  version 500RE, petrol version 500B and gas version 500BR.

The 500 was characterized by having an aerodynamic shape, which was improved over the years during production. The 500 model was the last conventional truck produced by Alfa Romeo, after which the company concentrated on producing cabover trucks.

The Alfa Romeo 500 was used by the Royal Italian Army during World War II under the heading of "500 DR." It was used in the campaign in Russia and the armored version was used in the Balkan campaign. The frame of the model was also used as basis for military buses.

From 1937 to 1940 Alfa Romeo 500 was also used by the Italian Fire Department as a fire engine or truck. The 500 was also used by Alfa Romeo and Scuderia Ferrari as a racing car transporter for both grand prix racers and Formula 1 cars. Viberti and Bergomi made various bus versions using 500 platform as basis.

Alfa Romeo 500 range 

 Alfa 500 base, 1937–38, 4x2 truck, diesel engine, manufactured 1.481 units
 Alfa 500 G, gas engine
 Alfa 500 RM, reinforced chassis and gas methane
 Alfa 500 RB, reinforced chassis and petrol engine
 Alfa 500 AL, bus chassis, diesel engine
 Alfa 500 RE, military version manufactured between 1943 and 1944 357 units, petrol engine

Technical specifications

Notes 

Alfa Romeo trucks
Vehicles introduced in 1937
Military trucks of Italy